Kiska (Kıska) is a rural locality (a selo) in Choyskoye Rural Settlement of Choysky District, the Altai Republic, Russia. The population was 143 as of 2016. There are 4 streets.

Geography 
Kiska is located east from Gorno-Altaysk, in the valley of the Isha River, 11 km northwest of Choya (the district's administrative centre) by road. Gusevka is the nearest rural locality.

References 

Rural localities in Choysky District